Anders Rasmussen (born 25 February 1975) is a Danish cricketer. He made his List A debut against Argentina in the 2007 ICC World Cricket League Division Two, where he took the single wicket of Pedro Bruno but did not bat.

Earlier in his career, Rasmussen played two games in the 1997 ICC Trophy.

Notes

References
 
 

Danish cricketers
1975 births
Living people